The Babymakers is a 2012 American comedy film directed by Jay Chandrasekhar, and starring Paul Schneider, Olivia Munn and Kevin Heffernan. Chandrasekhar and Heffernan are both members of Broken Lizard. The film received a limited release on August 3, 2012 in theaters and on video on demand services. It received a DVD and Blu-ray release September 18, 2012.

Synopsis
After trying everything to get his wife Audrey (Munn) pregnant, Tommy (Schneider) suspects that he may be infertile. He recruits his friend (Heffernan) to help him rob a sperm bank where he once made a donation.

Cast

 Paul Schneider as Tommy Macklin
 Olivia Munn as Audrey Macklin
 Wood Harris as Darrell
 Kevin Heffernan as Wade
 Nat Faxon as Zig-Zag
 Jay Chandrasekhar as Ron Jon
 Constance Zimmer as Mona
 Aisha Tyler as Karen
 Jude Ciccolella as Coach Stubbs
 Tom Wright as Butcher
 Tommy Dewey as Todd
 Sharon Maughan as Dr. Roberts
 Tony Sancho as Pedro
 Philippe Brenninkmeyer as Dr. Vickery
 Helena Mattsson as Tanya
 Desi Lydic as Julie
 Bill Fagerbakke as Clark
 Jeanne Sakata as Wanda
 Hayes MacArthur as Leslie Jenkins
 Marc Evan Jackson as Jefferey
 Collette Wolfe as Allison
 Miles Fisher as Groom
 Noureen DeWulf as Bride
 Rick Overton as Officer Raspler
 M. C. Gainey as Officer Malloy
 Candace Smith as Roxie
 Lindsey Kraft as Greta

Reception 
The film has received largely negative reviews. Review aggregation website Rotten Tomatoes gives a score of 8% based on 51 reviews, and an average rating of 3.5/10. The critical consensus states: "The Babymakers mistakes raunch for humor and, despite a few sporadic laughs, wastes its otherwise capable cast on gross-out gags and misfired one-liners."

Roger Ebert gave the film 1 star out of 4.

References

External links
 
 
 

Broken Lizard
American comedy films
2010s English-language films
Films scored by Edward Shearmur
2012 films
2012 comedy films
Films directed by Jay Chandrasekhar
Films produced by Jason Blum
Blumhouse Productions films
2010s American films